Double-sideband suppressed-carrier transmission (DSB-SC) is  transmission in which frequencies produced by amplitude modulation  (AM) are symmetrically spaced above and below the carrier frequency and the carrier level is reduced to the lowest practical level, ideally being completely suppressed.
 
In the DSB-SC modulation, unlike in AM, the wave carrier is not transmitted; thus, much of the power is distributed between the side bands, which implies an increase of the cover in DSB-SC, compared to AM, for the same power use.

DSB-SC transmission is a special case of double-sideband reduced carrier transmission. It is used for radio data systems. This mode is frequently used in Amateur radio voice communications, especially on High-Frequency bands.

Spectrum
DSB-SC is basically an amplitude modulation wave without the carrier, therefore reducing power waste, giving it a 50% efficiency. This is an increase compared to normal AM transmission (DSB) that has a maximum efficiency of 33.333%, since 2/3 of the power is in the carrier which conveys no useful information and both sidebands containing identical copies of the same information. Single Side Band Suppressed Carrier (SSB-SC) is 100% efficient.

Spectrum plot of a DSB-SC signal:

Generation
DSB-SC is generated by a mixer. This consists of a message signal multiplied by a carrier signal. The mathematical representation of this process is shown below, where the product-to-sum trigonometric identity is used.

Demodulation
For DSBSC, Coherent Demodulation is done by multiplying the DSB-SC signal with the carrier signal (with the same phase as in the modulation process) just like the modulation process. This resultant signal is then passed through a low pass filter to produce a scaled version of the original message signal.

The equation above shows that by multiplying the modulated signal by the carrier signal, the result is a scaled version of the original message signal plus a second term. Since , this second term is much higher in frequency than the original message. Once this signal passes through a low pass filter, the higher frequency component is removed, leaving just the original message.

Distortion and attenuation
For demodulation, the demodulation oscillator's frequency and phase must be exactly the same as the modulation oscillator's, otherwise, distortion and/or attenuation will occur.

To see this effect, take the following conditions:
Message signal to be transmitted: 
Modulation (carrier) signal: 
Demodulation signal (with small frequency and phase deviations from the modulation signal): 

The resultant signal can then be given by

The  terms results in distortion and attenuation of the original message signal.

How it works 
This is best shown graphically.  Below is a message signal that one may wish to modulate onto a carrier, consisting of a couple of sinusoidal components with frequencies respectively 800 Hz and 1200 Hz.

The carrier, in this case, is a plain 5 kHz sinusoid—pictured below.

The modulation is performed by multiplication in the time domain, which yields a 5 kHz carrier signal, whose amplitude varies in the same manner as the message signal.

The name "suppressed carrier" comes about because the carrier signal component is suppressed—it does not appear in the output signal.  This is apparent when the spectrum of the output signal is viewed. In the picture shown below we see four peaks, the two peaks below 5000 Hz are the lower sideband (LSB) and the two peaks above 5000 Hz are the upper sideband (USB), but there is no peak at the 5000 Hz mark, which is the frequency of the suppressed carrier.

References

External links
A DSBSC generation and demodulation instrument is described as side application of a commercial lock-in amplifier in Double-sideband Suppressed-carrier Modulation.

Radio modulation modes